Simon d'Artois (born January 26, 1992) is a Canadian freestyle skier. 
Born and raised in Whistler, BC. 
He is a member of the Canadian National Halfpipe team. d'Artois competed at the Winter X Games XIX, obtaining the first Canadian gold in the Men's SuperPipe. He has also competed at the U.S. Grand Prix, where in 2013 he fell and hit his head and shoulders near the end of his Superpipe jump.

d’Artois was ranked number 1 for the 2018/2019 world cup halfpipe season, securing him the crystal globe. 

In March 2021, d’Artois achieved a silver medal at the World Championships and, in December 2021, a bronze medal at the Calgary Snow Rodeo. In January 2022, d'Artois was named to Canada's 2022 Olympic team.

References

External links
Freestyle Ski profile

1992 births
Living people
Canadian male freestyle skiers
Superpipe skiers
X Games athletes
Freestyle skiers at the 2018 Winter Olympics
Freestyle skiers at the 2022 Winter Olympics
Olympic freestyle skiers of Canada
Sportspeople from North Vancouver